Angela Brazil (pronounced "brazzle") (30 November 186813 March 1947) was one of the first British writers of "modern schoolgirls' stories", written from the characters' point of view and intended primarily as entertainment rather than moral instruction. In the first half of the 20th century she published nearly 50 books of girls' fiction, the vast majority being boarding school stories. She also published numerous short stories in magazines.

Her books were commercially successful, widely read by pre-adolescent girls, and influenced them.  Though interest in girls' school stories waned after World War II, her books remained popular until the 1960s. They were seen as disruptive and a negative influence on moral standards by some figures in authority during the height of their popularity, and in some cases were banned, or indeed burned, by headmistresses in British girls' schools.

While her stories have been much imitated in more recent decades, and many of her motifs and plot elements have since become clichés or the subject of parody, they were innovative when they first appeared. Brazil made a major contribution to changing the nature of fiction for girls. She presented a young female point of view which was active, aware of current issues and independent-minded; she recognised adolescence as a time of transition, and accepted girls as having common interests and concerns which could be shared and acted upon.

Biography

Early life
Angela Brazil was born on 30 November 1858, at her home, 1 West Cliff, Preston, Lancashire. She was the youngest child of Clarence Brazil, a mill manager, and Angelica McKinnel, the daughter of the owner of a shipping line in Rio de Janeiro, who had a Spanish mother. Angela was the youngest of four siblings including sister Amy, and two brothers, Clarence and Walter.

Her father Clarence was distant, seldom involved himself in his children's affairs, and saw himself primarily as a provider for the material well-being of the family and responsible for ensuring the children were appropriately schooled in religious tradition. She was primarily influenced by her mother, Angelica, who had suffered during her Victorian English schooling, and was determined to bring up her children in a liberated, creative and nurturing manner, encouraging them to be interested in literature, music and botany, a departure from the typical distant attitude towards children adopted by parents in the Victorian era. Angela was treated with great affection by her sister Amy from an early age, and Amy effected an immense, perhaps dominating influence on Angela throughout her life.

The family moved around the mill towns of south-east Lancashire, following her father's work opportunities. They lived in Manchester and Bolton, before settling in Bury.

Schooling
She commenced her education at age four at Miss Knowle's Select Ladies School in Preston, but lasted only a half-day. Having been brought up to express herself freely, she shocked the younger Miss Knowles by removing the teacher's hair pins while sitting on her knee, an action little in keeping with the strict disciplinarian ethos of the school. She was enrolled in The Turrets in Wallasey.

She was briefly at Manchester Secondary School and finally at Ellerslie, a fairly exclusive girls' school in Malvern, where she boarded in her later adolescence.

Her memories of her own schooldays were her most treasured, and she retained aspects of that period of her life into her adult years:

To be able to write for young people depends, I consider, largely upon whether you are able to retain your early attitude of mind while acquiring a certain facility with your pen. It is a mistake ever to grow up! I am still an absolute schoolgirl in my sympathies.

Her post-school education was at Heatherley School of Fine Art in London, where she studied with her sister Amy. It is possible she took a position as a governess, but mostly lived with her family. After her father's death, in 1899, the family moved to the Conwy valley, and she travelled with her mother in Europe.

Commencing writing
Brazil first starting writing at age 10, producing a magazine with her close childhood friend Leila Langdale, which was modelled on Little Folks, a children's publication of the time she was very fond of. The two girls' 'publication' included riddles, short stories and poems. Both girls wrote serials within their magazine; Brazil's was called Prince Azib. Later in life Brazil published in Little Folks.

She began writing seriously for children in her 30s. Her first school story was The Fortunes of Philippa, which was based on the experiences of her mother. It was not published until 1906, and her first published children's novel was A Terrible Tomboy (1904).

Move to Coventry
She spent most of her time with her mother until her death, and thereafter with her elder sister Amy, and brother Walter. She had only two major friendships outside the family circle, one of which started in her school days and the other in her 30s. Both friends were schoolgirls when the friendships first commenced.

She moved to 1 The Quadrant, Coventry in 1911, with her brother and they were joined by her sister Amy upon their mother's death in 1915. Brazil became a well-known figure in the local area.

She was well known in Coventry high society as a hostess and threw parties for adults, with a greater number of female guests, at which children's food and games were featured. She had no children of her own but also hosted many parties for children.

She read widely and collected early children's fiction; her collection is now in Coventry library. She took great interest in local history and antiquities, and also involved herself in charity work. She was an early conservationist, taking an interest in both the preservation of land and monuments, worked for the City of Coventry Cathedral and the Y.W.C.A, and was a founding member of the City Guild.

She never married.

Her writing

Writing and publication

She was quite late in taking up writing, developing a strong interest in Welsh mythology, and at first wrote a few magazine articles on mythology and nature - due most likely to spending holidays in an ancient cottage called Ffynnon Bedr in Llanbedr y Cennin, North Wales (a plaque at the cottage states she lived there 1902-1927).

Her first publication was a book of four children's plays entitled The Mischievous Brownie. Written in Wales, and published in 1899 by T W. Paterson of Edinburgh, the plays featured fairies, ogres and enchantments. Family and friends encouraged her to write a novel for an adult audience, but she had already set her heart on writing for children. She began work on her first full-length tale for children, The Fortunes of Philippa, in the same year, after her father's death.

Her first published novel was A Terrible Tomboy (1905), but this was not strictly a school story. The story was autobiographical, with Brazil represented as the principal character Peggy, and her friend Leila Langdale appearing as Lilian. It was an early success for Brazil, and did well in the United States, perhaps as a result of the popularity of Tomboy stories, which had grown in popularity in that country since the mid-19th century.

Her long sequence of school stories did not commence until the publication of her second novel The Fortunes of Philippa (1906). The novel was based on her mother, Angelica Brazil, who had grown up in Rio de Janeiro and attended an English boarding school at the age of 10, finding the English culture, school life and climate confronting.

The Fortunes of Philippa was an instant success, and Brazil soon received commissions to produce similar work. In total she published 49 novels about life in boarding schools, and approximately 70 short stories, which appeared in magazines. Her average production of these tales was two novels and five short stories each year.

Her fifth novel, Bosom Friends: A Seaside Story (1910) was published by Nelson's, but subsequent books were all published by Blackie and Sons. Blackie and Sons sold three million copies of her novels. Her most popular school story novel, The Nicest Girl in The School (1909) sold 153,000 copies. By 1920 the school story was the most popular genre for girls.

Style and themes
Angela Brazil is seen as the first writer of girls' school story fiction who wrote stories from the point of view of the pupils and whose stories were mostly intended to entertain readers, rather than instruct them on moral principles. She intended to write stories that were fun and included characters who were ordinary people. She wrote for girls gaining a greater level of freedom in the early 20th century and intended to capture their point of view.

Unlike many of her successors, Brazil never wrote a series of books set in a particular school, although there are three pairs of books among her 46 full-length school stories: A Fortunate Term and Monitress Merle; At School with Rachel and St. Catherine's College; and The Little Green School and Jean's Golden Term. Monitress Merle also has a substantial character overlap with The Head Girl at The Gables, and A Fortunate Term has a slight connection with The Girls of St. Cyprian's. Most of her novels present new characters, a new school and a new scenario, although these are frequently formulaic, especially in the books written later in her career.

Her schools usually have between 20 and 50 pupils and so are able to create a community which is an extended family, but also of sufficient size to function as a kind of micro state, with its own traditions and rules. The schools tend to be situated in picturesque circumstances, being manors, having moats, being built on clifftops or on moors, and the style of teaching is often progressive, including experiments in self-expression, novel forms of exercise, and different social groups and activities for the girls.

The narrative focuses on the girls, who tend to be between 14 and 15. Although they are high-spirited and active, they are not eccentric or directly conflicting with social norms, as had been the case with Tomboy fiction. They are adolescents, shown as being in a normal period of transition in their lives, with a restlessness that tends to be expressed by minor adventures such as climbing out of dormitory windows at night, playing pranks on one another and their teachers and searching for spies in their midst. They also typically develop their own behavioural codes, have a slang or secret language, which is exclusive to the school.

The stories tend to focus on relationships between the pupils, including alliances between pairs and groups of girls, jealousy between them, and the experience of characters who feel excluded from the school community. Events which have become familiar from the girls' school fiction written since Brazil, are common, such as secret night-time meetings, achieving and receiving honours or prizes and events at the end of term such as concerts.

In addition to her books, she also contributed a large number of school stories to children's annuals and the Girl's Own Paper.

Antecedents and influences
Brazil did not invent the story of boarding school life, although she was a major influence over its transformation. There was already an established tradition of fiction for young women, in which school life was presented as a crucible for their development. The Governess, or The Little Female Academy by Sarah Fielding, published in 1749, is generally seen as the first boarding school story. Fielding's novel was a moralistic tale with tangents offering instruction on behaviour, and each of the nine girls in the novel relate their story individually. However it did establish aspects of the boarding school story which were repeated in later works. The school is self-contained with little connection to local life, the girls are encouraged to live together with a sense of community and collective responsibility, and one of the characters experiences a sleepless night, a standard motif in subsequent girls' fiction.

Fielding's approach was imitated and used as a formula by both her contemporaries and other writers into the 19th century. Susan Coolidge in What Katy Did at School (1873) and Frances Hodgson Burnett, with Sara Crewe: or what Happened at Miss Minchin's (1887) (later rewritten as A Little Princess) also used a girls' school setting. A character in Brazil's The Third Class at Miss Kaye's quotes these novels as an example of the sort of rigid Victorian environment she had been expecting to find at boarding school. However, probably the most widely read and influential of Brazil's 19th-century predecessors in girls' fiction, was L. T. Meade. Meade was voted most popular writer in 1898 by the readers of Girls' Realm and used some innovations in her girls' school stories which were later developed by Brazil.

Literary and social context

Shift towards collective education for girls
In the first decades of the 20th century there was a change in education for middle-class girls. Previously it had been common for girls to be educated by a private tutor, an approach which led to young women growing up with a feeling of isolation from their peers. Brazil's boarding school stories were a prominent expression of this shift, and helped promote a sense of young women being a community with a shared identity as schoolgirls, in which individual girls could share common concerns and issues affecting their lives and act together. The emerging middle classes also could not afford private tuition for their daughters, and while anxious not to send them to poor schools, took advantage of the growing number of private schools for girls, of which there were at least one in most English cities by 1878.

Change in general education for girls
Brazil's first schoolgirl tales were also published in an era of increased literacy for girls, encouraged by the education acts passed into law in 1902 and 1907 and thus appeared at a particularly ripe time for publishing success and influence upon readers beyond those able to attend boarding schools. Between 1900 and 1920, the number of girls at grammar schools increased from 20,000 to 185,000. Curriculum for girls' study in general also become more liberal in this period. During the same period boarding schools for girls had gain respectability among middle class parents. These schools included a range of activities besides academic study, including activities such as lacrosse, hockey and fencing. Together with changes in the wider social context, which gave more educational and professional openings for girls, this reflected a more general sense of a world where a wider enjoyment of life and opportunity was much more available for girls than had been the case.

Changing norms in girls' fiction
Much of the fiction for girls being published at the turn of the century was instructional, and focused on promoting self-sacrifice, moral virtues, dignity and aspiring to a settled position in an ordered society. Brazil's fiction presented energetic characters who openly challenged authority, were cheeky, perpetrated pranks, and lived in a world which celebrated their youth and in which adults and their concerns were sidelined.

While popular with girls, Brazil's books were not approved of by many adults and even banned by some headmistresses, seeing them as subversive and damaging to young minds. In 1936 Ethel Strudwick, principal of St Paul's Girls' School in London, reacted to a novella about the school by announcing at morning prayers that she would gather all of Brazil's books and set them alight.

Brazil's own fiction also changed to reflect developing attitudes and changing social mores and the changing expectations of her readers. Her stories written before 1914, the beginning of the First World War, lean more towards issues of character that were typical in Victorian fiction for girls. Those written after this become more critical of this approach, and the heroines more liberated, in parallel with changing possibilities and attitudes towards girls and their potential to become more active in wider aspects of society.

Parallel to developments in fiction for boys
Boys' school stories were popular from the 1870s until the 1930s and continued to find an audience into the 1970s. Prominent writers included Talbot Baines Reed, and Charles Hamilton, who wrote under a number of pen names, including Frank Richards, as author of the successful Greyfriars School series. Anthony Buckeridge later wrote the Jennings books. Themes between boys' and girls' school fiction had some commonality, such as sports, honour, and friendship.

It has been claimed that the appearance of girls' boarding school stories was a response to a parallel development of the equivalent for boys in the same period, and there are certainly elements of boys' stories, such as Tom Brown's Schooldays by Thomas Hughes, and the Greyfriars tales by Frank Richards, appear to have been borrowed by writers of girls' stories, including Brazil. However, this may accord an undue influence to this literature, as there had been a gradual development from the 18th century toward fiction which was more specifically focused on gender, and many of the tropes in Brazil's books derive from the real-life schools attended by early 20th-century girls.

There were also male readers of Brazil's works, although they tended to consume these books secretly and guiltily. These including a number of prominent figures, who confessed to liking the stories in childhood, later in life. This was also a period in which girls' high schools and boarding schools were developing, drawing on aspects of the longer-established boys' boarding schools, but also developing their own culture which was more focused on encouraging friendship and security: elements which many boys, not attracted to the culture of tough masculinity in boys' schools, could relate to. There may also have been as aspect of voyeuristic attraction in boys reading stories about an environment exclusively focused on girls.

Influence
Angela Brazil is frequently held to be largely responsible for establishing the girls' school story genre, which exerted a major effect on the reading practices of girls for decades after she began publishing her novels, although this belief has been challenged. Her motifs and ideas have become a common part of popular imagination since publication and inspired many imitators and successors. J.K. Rowling's Harry Potter series draws upon many elements of English public school education fiction that Brazil's work helped to establish.

Towards the end of the 20th century, girls' school stories had in many respects become seen as a cliché, with standard character types such as the oddball but courageous new girl and the practical but fair headmistress, and recurring scenes such as a midnight feast, pranks, heroic rescues and concert at the end of term. Many parodies of these types of stories have been produced. However, when Brazil first wrote schoolgirl tales she was not simply repeating established norms in fiction for young women, and her approach (together with other girls' writers of this period) was innovative and actually establishing new ideas about girls' lives, which were simplified and turned into stock motifs by later writers.

Popular writers of girls' school stories who certainly read Angela Brazil's books include Elinor Brent-Dyer with her Chalet School series, and Enid Blyton with her tales about Malory Towers and St Clares.  Brent-Dyer, whose first volume in the Chalet School series appeared in 1925, published 57 more books in the series and these books were still selling 150,000 copies a year in the late 1990s. Dorita Fairlie Bruce and Elsie Oxenham should also be mentioned and from the 21st century, Tyne O'Connell. Despite the fact that many of these stories included archaic motifs and representations, they still remain popular.

Interpretations of lesbian content
It has been suggested that Brazil's tales were intended to be covertly expressive of lesbian themes. Her stories of friendships between girls do include kissing between pupils and less frequently between pupils and teachers, and also elements of adolescent jealousy, but such actions would likely have been viewed as relatively unremarkable at a time when romantic friendships were common. It is possible that Brazil, writing about her own youthful experiences of schoolgirl life, was completely unaware of these implications, and passionate friendships between adolescent girls are not uncommon. Nevertheless, the tone of the relationships in her stories was highly sentimental and might be interpreted as having erotic implications. In fact, Brazil seemed particularly attached to the name Lesbia, which was given to several important characters: Lesbia Ferrars in Loyal to the School, for instance, and Lesbia Carrington in For the School Colours. Both of these seem to have been largely self-portraits, suitably idealised.

Bibliography

This bibliography is based largely around the bibliography given in Sims and Clare, supplemented with information from the Jisc Library Hub Discover, and other sources as indicated. The column On PG''' indicates is the book is available on Project Gutenberg.

Example of illustration
The following illustrations (a colour frontispiece and four black and white illustrations) were prepared by Arthur A(ugustus) Dixon (8 May 1972 – 30 May 1959)	
 for Brazil's most popular story The Nicest Girl in the School (1909).

Natural History records
Brazil was interested and knowledgeable about natural history. She was part of a field studies group in Wales with her sister, and also recorded what she saw on walks around Coventry. Over two decades she made detailed notes about plants, birds and animals she had seen as well as some watercolour paintings for her personal records. These are now housed at the Herbert Art Gallery and Museum in Coventry. Some of the watercolours were included in the UnNatural History exhibition as part of Coventry UK City of Culture in 2021.

See also

 The Chalet School series by Elinor Brent-Dyer
 The Melling School series by Margaret Biggs
 The Abbey Series, Abbey Connectors and other series of books about schoolgirls by Elsie J. Oxenham
 School story
Pony books, often featuring and aimed at teen girls

Notes

References

SourcesMy Own Schooldays. Angela Brazil, 1926.The Schoolgirl Ethic: The Life and Work of Angela Brazil. Gillian Freeman, 1976You're a Brick, Angela!'' Mary Cadogan and Patricia Craig, Gollancz, London, 1976.
 Shropshire-cc.gov.uk  accessed 10 January 2006 (UTC)
 Collectingbooksandmagazines.com  accessed 10 January 2006 (UTC)

External links 

 
 
 
 
 

1868 births
1947 deaths
Writers from Preston, Lancashire
English children's writers
Victorian women writers
20th-century English novelists
20th-century British women writers
British women children's writers
British women novelists
Alumni of the Heatherley School of Fine Art